The initialism CCE may refer to:

Organizations
 Canadian Cinema Editors
 Chicago Climate Exchange
 Coca-Cola Enterprises, a major bottler of Coca-Cola
 Comhaltas Ceoltóirí Éireann, an organisation in Ireland which is dedicated to the promotion of Irish music, song, dance and language
 Congregation for Catholic Education, a dicastery of the Roman Curia
 Co-operative Central Exchange, an American consumer cooperative wholesale distributor
 Council on Chiropractic Education, an accrediting agency for chiropractic schools, and its international affiliates
 Creativity, Culture and Education, an organisation created to improve the quality and reach of cultural education

Science
 Capacitative Calcium Entry
 Certified Computer Examiner
 Common Configuration Enumeration
 Congenital cystic eye, a rare ocular malformation
 Connected Consumer Electronics, a field related to Machine to Machine (M2M) communication
 Controlled Combustion Engine
 Copolymer Composition Equation, another name for the Mayo-Lewis equation
 Current crowding effect

Education
 a university department or school of Chemistry and Chemical Engineering, e.g. at Queen's University Belfast
 Continuous and Comprehensive Evaluation, a system of evaluation introduced by the Central Board of Secondary Education of India
 Centre for Continuing Education, part of the University of Sydney
 EDHEC Sailing Cup (Course Croisière EDHEC), a student sailing race on the French Atlantic Coast

Other
 Camouflage Central-Europe, a French woodland camouflage pattern
 Certified Culinary Educator ®, an American Culinary Federation (ACF) certification
 Daytona USA: Championship Circuit Edition, a video game
 Java.lang.ClassCastException, in Java programming
 Continuing Criminal Enterprise, a type of criminal organization defined in law in the USA.
 Cohiba (cigar brand) (Cohiba Corona Especiales), a Cuban cigar
 Correspondence Chess Expert, a title in correspondence chess